There are numerous places named Robert E. Lee Elementary School.  These include:

 Robert E. Lee Elementary School (Abilene, Texas)
 Robert E. Lee Elementary School (Amarillo, Texas) (renamed Park Hills Elementary in 2019)
 Robert E. Lee Elementary School (Austin, Texas) (renamed Russell Lee Elementary in 2016)
 Robert E. Lee Elementary School (Columbia, Missouri) (renamed Locust Street Expressive Arts Elementary School in 2018)
 Robert E. Lee Elementary School (Dallas, Texas), East Dallas (renamed Geneva Heights Elementary School in 2018)
 Robert E. Lee Elementary School (Denton, Texas)
 Robert E. Lee Elementary School (Durant, Oklahoma)
 Robert E. Lee Elementary School (Eagle Pass, Texas)
 Robert E. Lee Elementary School (East Wenatchee, Washington)
 Robert E. Lee Elementary School (El Paso, Texas)
 Robert E. Lee Elementary School (Grand Prairie, Texas)
 Robert E. Lee Elementary School (Hugo, Oklahoma)
 Robert E. Lee Elementary School (Long Beach, California) (renamed Oliva Nieto Herrara Elementary in 2016)
Robert E. Lee Elementary School (Marshall, Texas)
 Robert E. Lee Elementary School (Hampton, Virginia) (closed in 2010)
 Robert E. Lee Elementary School (Jackson, Mississippi)
 Robert E. Lee Elementary School (Richmond, Virginia)
 Robert E. Lee Elementary School (San Diego, California) (renamed Pacific View Leadership Elementary in 2016)
 Robert E. Lee Elementary School (Satsuma, Alabama)
 Robert E. Lee Elementary School (Springdale, Arkansas)
 Robert E. Lee Elementary School (Spotsylvania, Virginia) (renamed Spotsylvania Elementary in 2021)
 Robert E. Lee Elementary Magnet School of World Studies & Technology (Tampa, Florida)
 Robert E. Lee Elementary School (Tullahoma, Tennessee)
 Robert E. Lee Elementary School (Tulsa, Oklahoma) (renamed Council Oaks Elementary School in 2018)

See also
 Lee-Jackson Elementary School (Mathews, Virginia)
 Lee School (disambiguation)

References

Monuments and memorials to Robert E. Lee